Thomas Cushing Aylwin (January 5, 1806 – October 14, 1871) was a Quebec lawyer, judge and political figure.

He was born in Quebec City in 1806, the grandson of Thomas Aylwin, a merchant in Quebec City. Aylwin studied at Harvard University, then articled in law and was called to the bar in 1827. He entered the practice of law in partnership with Edward Short. In 1841, he was elected to the Legislative Assembly of the Province of Canada for Portneuf; he was reelected in 1844 and 1848 for Quebec City. In 1845 he challenged the provincial secretary Sir Dominick Daly to a duel after a quarrel over Daly's refusal to leave office. Shots were exchanged but neither man was injured. Aylwin served as solicitor general for Canada East from 1842 to 1843, resigning to protest Governor Sir Charles Metcalfe's refusal to consult the Executive Council on patronage appointments, and served again in the same post in 1848. Later in 1848, he resigned his seat to accept an appointment as judge in the Court of Queen's Bench. Aylwin resigned from the bench in 1868 after suffering a stroke.

He died in Montreal in 1871. Aylwin was buried at Mount Hermon Cemetery in Sillery, on October 17, 1871.

Aylwin Township in the Outaouais region of Quebec, Canada, was named in his honour in 1858 (but was renamed to Kazabazua in 1976).

References
 

The Canadian portrait gallery, JC Dent (1881)

1806 births
1871 deaths
Harvard University alumni
Members of the Legislative Assembly of the Province of Canada from Canada East
Lawyers in Quebec
Judges in Quebec
Politicians from Quebec City
Burials at Mount Hermon Cemetery
Canadian duellists